Fontaine-de-Vaucluse (or simply ) is a commune in the southeastern French department of Vaucluse. In 2018, it had a population of 585. Its name comes from the spring of the same name; the name Vaucluse itself comes from the Latin phrase vallis clausa or "closed valley".

Heraldry
The coat of arms of the village of Fontaine-de-Vaucluse is:"Blue, with a Trout and a Grayling, poised horizontally." (Malte-Brun, in France Illustrated, book V, 1884)

Geography

Situation

Fontaine-de-Vaucluse ("spring of Vaucluse") is built around the Fontaine de Vaucluse, a spring in a valley at the foot of the Vaucluse Mountains, between Saumane-de-Vaucluse and Lagnes, not far from L'Isle-sur-la-Sorgue. It is named after the spring, the source of the River Sorgue.

Hydrography
The fountain, or spring, of Vaucluse, situated at the feet of a steep limestone cliff 230 metres high, is the biggest spring in France. It is also the fifth largest in the world with an annual flow of 630 million cubic metres.

The fountain of Vaucluse surges in March for about 5 weeks and then subsides.  The increased flow of water swells the Sorgue to flood.  The mechanism behind the surging remains somewhat of a mystery.

History
This village of about 600 inhabitants was once called Vaucluse or the "closed valley" (Vallis Clausa in Latin) and it gave its name to the French department of Vaucluse. Several trails indicate human occupation in the area since the neolithic era.  Its spring has been the object of a major cult since Antiquity, and the Sorgue was used as a trade route by the Phoenicians of Massalia and later the Romans. Following some major discoveries from two cave dives by the SSFV, two archaeological sites under the protection of the SRA PACA has allowed more than 1600 antique coins from the first century BC to the 5th century AD to be brought back up to the surface.

In the Middle Ages, a hermit supposedly lived in the spot. Eventually, he performed miracles that led to his being consecrated as Bishop of Cavaillon. His successor, Walcaudus, received the consent of the ruling counts of the area to settle monks there. A monastery was constructed, but was ruined by the 11th century. Clement, the Bishop of Cavaillon, ordered its reconstruction by Isarn, abbot of Sainte-Victoire. The poet Petrarch made it his preferred residence in the 14th century, writing, "The illustrious source of the Sorgue, famous for itself long ago, became even more famous by my long stay and my songs."  (Petrarch, Seniles, X, 2).

The poet left in 1353 after his son's death. The village was razed shortly afterward by bandits, who withdrew at the sight of the intimidating episcopal seat. A museum stands on the spot of Petrarch's house today, and the town is twinned with Arquà Petrarca, where the poet died. Following this attack, the village and valley fell into oblivion. Thought of as a wild place, it was avoided through the 16th and 17th centuries. Vaucluse was again popularized by a duel between the famous Honore Gabriel Riqueti and Louis-Francois de Galliffet. A letter published by Riqueti brought fame to the area again, and a column was built to honour Petrarch in the eighteenth century.

In 1946, Jacques Cousteau and another diver were almost killed while searching for the bottom of the spring. An air compressor used to fill their tanks had taken in its own exhaust fumes and produced carbon monoxide—nearly killing them before they could return to the surface from a depth of approximately 100 metres.

Demographics
Historical population:

Places and monuments

 The principal point of interest is the source of the Sorgue at the foot of a cliff 240 metres high: Its average flow is 22 m3 / second, the highest in France, and can attain 110 m3 after the snow melts. It wasn't until 1985 that the mystery of its origin was partially revealed: in effect, the lowest point is at -308m depth attained  by a robot belonging to the Spelunking Society of Fontaine de Vaucluse. The spring is the only exit point of a subterranean basin of 1200 km2 that collects the water from Mount Ventoux, the Vaucluse mountains and from the Lure mountain.
 Ruins of the castle of the Bishop of Cavaillon
 Ancient paper mill
 Museum of the Resistance
 Petrarch museum (on the site of his former house)
 Santon museum

People related to Fontaine-de-Vaucluse
The following people are related to Fontaine-de-Vaucluse:
 Veranus of Cavaillon
 Philippe de Cabassoles
 Fernand Meyssonnier

Gallery

References

External links

 Official website
 tourism : visit of Fontaine-de-Vaucluse
 The History of the Fontaine de Vaucluse cave - SSFV : Fontaine de Vaucluse cave exploration and cave diving association  (Société Spéléologique de Fontaine de Vaucluse, ".fr" link)
 www.laSorgue.com
 Fontaine-de-Vaucluse sur le site de l'Institut Géographique National
 Fontaine-de-Vaucluse on the INSEE website
 Société Spéléologique de Fontaine de Vaucluse (Speleological Society of the Vaucluse Resurgence), ".org" link - a holding page on last trying.
 Office of Tourism
 

Communes of Vaucluse
Springs of France
Landforms of Provence-Alpes-Côte d'Azur